Bythinella markovi is a species of very small freshwater snail, an aquatic gastropod mollusk in the family Amnicolidae (according to the taxonomy of the Gastropoda by Bouchet & Rocroi, 2005).

Distribution
This species is endemic to Bulgaria, and is known only from Gardina Dupka Cave, in the Western Rhodopes.

References

Gastropods described in 2009
Endemic fauna of Bulgaria